Trachylepis damarana, also known as the Damara skink or Damara variable skink, is a species of skink. It is found in southern Africa, specifically in south-eastern Angola, northern Namibia, western Zambia, northern and eastern Botswana, Zimbabwe, north-eastern South Africa, and western Mozambique.

Trachylepis damarana is a very common terrestrial skink inhabiting open, rocky habitats in savanna. It has fully developed limbs and can reach  in snout–vent length.

References

Trachylepis
Skinks of Africa
Reptiles of Angola
Reptiles of Botswana
Reptiles of Mozambique
Reptiles of Namibia
Reptiles of South Africa
Reptiles of Zambia
Reptiles of Zimbabwe
Reptiles described in 1870
Taxa named by Wilhelm Peters